Nascent Glacier is a short, fairly smooth glacier in the east extremity of Mountaineer Range, draining southeast to the coast of Victoria Land between Gauntlet Ridge and Index Point. So named in 1966 by New Zealand Antarctic Place-Names Committee (NZ-APC), presumably as descriptive of the emerging or youthful development of the feature.

Glaciers of Victoria Land
Borchgrevink Coast